Lillian Township is one of thirty-one townships in Custer County, Nebraska, United States. The population was 130 at the 2020 census. A 2021 estimate placed the township's population at 129.

Lillian Township was named for Lillian Gohean, the daughter of a local postmaster.

See also
County government in Nebraska
Township: Lillian
Cemetery: Lillian
Family last name is spelled Goheen

References

External links
City-Data.com

Townships in Custer County, Nebraska
Townships in Nebraska